Equipment is a fashion label currently based in Los Angeles, California. Originally launched in 1976 by Christian Restoin, husband of former Vogue Paris Editor-in-chief Carine Roitfeld, the brand is currently carried in over 60 countries and 600 retail doors, including two Equipment retail stores.

History 
Christian Restoin launched the brand in 1976. Restoin left the brand in 1998.

Equipment was re-launched in 2010 by Serge Azria, the older brother of Max Azria, head of the BCBG Max Azria Group empire, and has since been spotted on celebrities such as Kate Bosworth, Diane Kruger, and Anne Hathaway.

The brand is currently headquartered in Los Angeles, operating under the parent company, The Collected Group, LLC, along with contemporary brands, Joie and Current/Elliott.

Retail 
Equipment opened its first freestanding flagship location in New York's Soho neighborhood in December 2012, followed by a West Coast location in West Hollywood's Melrose Place shopping district.

Collaborations 
Notable brand collaborators include Los Angeles-based accessories designer, Clare Vivier, and French illustrator/influencer, Garance Doré.

Campaigns 
In 2013, Equipment partnered with Alison Mosshart and British guitarist Jamie Hince of The Kills.

In Fall 2014, Equipment partnered with model/photographer Daria Werbowy, giving her creative freedom to shoot and model in the brand's next three advertising campaigns.

In 2016, Equipment enlisted Daria Werbowy to photograph Kate Moss for Equipment's Spring advertising campaign.

References

External links
Equipment - Official website

High fashion brands
Clothing brands of the United States
Companies that filed for Chapter 11 bankruptcy in 2021